Troy Moloney (born 18 May 1966) is a former Australian rules footballer who played for Footscray Football Club in the Australian Football League (AFL). Moloney was recruited from East Keilor Football Club.

He made his senior debut in 1987 at the age of 20 after coming up through the ranks of the Under 19's and Reserves. Plagued by injury, Moloney would go on to play 36 senior games and kick 4 goals over six seasons at Footscray.

References

External links

1966 births
Living people
Western Bulldogs players
Williamstown Football Club players
Australian rules footballers from Victoria (Australia)